Expressways are the highest class of roads in India. As of March 2023, India has a total length of 4067.27 km (2,527.719mi) of expressways. These are controlled-access highways where entrance and exits are controlled by the use of ramps or interchange or trumphet that are incorporated into the design of the expressway and designed for maximum speed of 120 km/hr, whereas National highways are flyover access or controlled-access highway, where entrance and exit is through the side of the flyover, at each intersection of highway with road, flyovers are provided to bypass the city/town/village traffic and these highways are designed for speed of 100 km/hr. Some roads are not access-controlled expressways, but are still named as expressways, such as the Biju Expressway, these are actually state highways which are not declared by central government as an Expressway, hence not an Expressway or National Highway.
Mumbai–Pune Expressway is the first 6-lane operational expressway in India started in 2002. Expressways follow standards set by Indian Roads Congress and Bureau of Indian Standards. 

Development
Greenfield Expressways in India are designed as 12-lane wide Expressways with the initial construction of 8 lanes with minimum speed set as 120 km/hr for all type of vehicles. Land for 4-lane future expansion is reserved in the center of the expressways. Greenfield Expressways are designed to avoid inhabited areas and go through new alignments to bring development to new areas and to reduce land acquisition costs and construction timelines. The Delhi–Mumbai Expressway is an example of a new 12-lane approach with initial 8-lane construction.

Brownfield National Highway Project is the widening/development of existing National Highways. The upgradation of highway is a Brownfield Expressway Project which has high traffic demand and is a part of both rural and urban setup. The upgradation is carried from 4 Lane to 6 Lane on EPC mode. 43,000 km state highways have been converted to National Highways in last 8 years.

The majority of the investment required for constructing expressways comes from the central government. Uttar Pradesh and Maharashtra are the only states which are investing in building expressways through dedicated expressway corporations.

The National Highways Authority of India operating under the Ministry of Road Transport and Highways will be in-charge of the construction and maintenance of expressways. The National Highways Development Project by the government of India aims to expand the country's current expressway network and plans to add an additional 18,637 km of greenfield expressways by 2025 apart from building 4 lane greenfield national highways of 50,000 km length. Currently NHDP Phase-6 and NHDP Phase-7 construction is going on along with Bharatmala project.

Bharatmala is an ecosystem of road development which includes tunnels, bridges, elevated corridors, flyovers, overpass, interchanges, bypasses, ring roads etc. to provide shortest & optimized connectivity to multiple places, it is a centrally-sponsored and funded road and highways project of the Government of India with a target of constructing 83,677 km of new highways over the next five years, was started in 2017 as well as conversion of 4 lane highways into 6 lane Brownfield expressways & some state highways into NH/NE. Phase I of the Bharatmala project involves the construction of 34,800 km of highways (including the remaining projects under NHDP) at an estimated cost of ₹5.35 lakh crore by 2021–22.

Characteristics

In 2017, the country had only approximately 934 km of expressways. All the expressways are 6 or more lane wide controlled-access highways, where entrance and exit are controlled by the use of slip roads. India has the second largest road network in the world with 6.3 million kms.

Expressways By State 
List of operational expressways by state, as of March 2023:

Total Operational Expressways By Type

National Expressways 
As of April 2021, eight expressways have been declared as National Expressway (NE) by the Ministry of Road Transport and Highways.

State Expressways(Connecting remote areas of states) 
State Expressways are funded by State/Central Government to connect areas within the state. These expressways reduce travel time, allowing for more more efficient travel and fuel savings . This also allows for a more equal distribution of goods, especially to rural areas.These expressways are not part of National Expressways but may be operated by state authority or national authority.

Note: AC = Access-Controlled Expressway. GS = Grade Separated Expressway.

Bypass Expressways(to bypass traffic within same city or between two cities) 

Bypass Expressways to bypass city traffic such as ring roads, bypass, freeways and elevated roads exist entirely within a city or between two cities. These expressways direct heavy traffic to the outskirts freeing city roads of traffic. This also allows outside traffic to directly pass the city instead of going through it further limiting traffic within a city. 

Note: AC = Access-Controlled Expressway. GS = Grade Separated Expressway.

Feeder Expressways/Link Expressways 
There are many controlled access feeder/link expressways under construction that will connect to the main State Expressways as different tributaries to the main expressway extending the connectivity of State expressways. 

Ambala-Shamli Expressway
Ballia Link Expressway
Bandikui Jaipur Fairlane Expressway, side spur to Delhi-Mumbai Expressway
DND–KMP Expressway
Faridabad-Jewar Expressway, side spur to Delhi-Mumbai Expressway
Gorakhpur Link Expressway
Kurnool Feeder Expressway
Kadapa Expressways
Jalna-Nanded Expressway
Indore-Mumbai Link Expressway, side spur to Delhi-Mumbai Expressway
 Virar-Alibaug Multi-Modal Corridor (MMC), Peripheral ring road of Mumbai(MMR), part of Delhi-Mumbai Expressway extension
Vadodara-Ankleshwar Expressway
Mumbai-Pune Missing Link Expressway
Saharanpur-Roorke-Haridwar Expressway

Expressways under-construction 
* Ready to inaugurate

Proposed expressways

Proposed expressways under Bharatmala

See also 

 Ring Roads in India
 Ring roads in India

 Similar rail development
 Future of rail transport in India, rail development
 List of high-speed railway lines in India

 Similar roads development
 Bharatmala
 Diamond Quadrilateral, Subsumed in Bharatmala
 Golden Quadrilateral, completed national road development connectivity older scheme
 National Highways Development Project, Subsumed in Bharatmala
 North-South and East-West Corridor, Subsumed in Bharatmala
 India-China Border Roads, Subsumed in Bharatmala
 Setu Bharatam, river road bridge development in India
 Char Dham Highway, a project under MoRTH

 Similar ports and river transport development
 Indian Rivers Inter-link
 List of National Waterways in India
 Sagar Mala project, national water port development connectivity scheme

 Similar air transport development
 Indian Human Spaceflight Programme
 UDAN, national airport development connectivity scheme

 Highways in India
 List of National Highways in India by highway number
 List of National Highways in India
 List of Expressway in Maharashtra

 General
 Transport in India
 Water transport in India

References

External links
 

 
Roads in India